Rowan Fergus Meredith Gillespie (born 1953) is an Irish bronze casting sculptor of international renown. Born in Dublin to Irish parents, Gillespie spent his formative years in Cyprus.

From conception to creation, he works alone in his purpose-built bronze casting foundry at Clonlea, in Blackrock. This is one of the things that make him unique among the bronze casting community.

Influenced by the sculptor Henry Moore and the painter Edvard Munch, Gillespie uses the lost wax casting process to portray human emotions. Having worked almost exclusively on site specific art since 1996, Gillespie's public works can be found in his native Ireland, Europe, the United States, and Canada.

Background
His father, Jack Gillespie, was a medical doctor and his mother, Moira, was the daughter of James Creed Meredith, the translator of Immanuel Kant's Critique of Judgement, Supreme Court of Ireland Judge, and member of the Irish Volunteers movement. According to Gillespie's official biographer Roger Kohn, the sculptor's work, Proclamation, situated across the road from Kilmainham Gaol in Dublin, was created in memory of both the Proclamation of the Irish Republic and of his grandfather's dream of a Utopian society.

Education and career

At age seven, he was sent to boarding school in England, although the family remained in Cyprus until he was ten. In 1969, he attended York School of Art where he was first introduced to the lost-wax casting process by the bronze sculptor Sally Arnup. Here he also met his wife to be, Hanne, who runs the Clonlea Yoga Studio in Blackrock. In 1970, he attended Kingston College of Art where he was tutored by woodcarver John Robson and through whom he met, and was encouraged by, Henry Moore.

Following his studies at York and Kingston, he completed his studies at the Statens Kunstole in Oslo. He lectured for three years at the Munch Museum, the Norwegian painter having a profound influence on him. Munch remains the great artistic influence on him up to the present day.

At the age of 21 he married Hanne, they had their first child Alexander, and he held his first solo exhibition in Norway. In 1977 he returned to Dublin where he set up his foundry/workshop and established himself in the years between 1977 and 1995 with Solo exhibitions at the Solomon Gallery in Dublin, arts fairs, and numerous group shows throughout Europe and the United States. He then decided to concentrate on site specific art, notably The Cycle of Life, Colorado (1991); The Famine Series, Dublin (1996/7); and Ripples of Ulysses 2000/1.

In 2007 he was awarded an honorary Doctorate in Fine Art by Regis University in Denver, Colorado.

Recent developments

Sculpting life

In 2007, Shane Brennan and Tom Burke of Moondance Productions released a film biography on Gillespie's life and work, called Sculpting Life.

The film received critical acclaim following its first broadcast on the Irish channel, RTÉ. The film, also aired on the Arts Channel in New Zealand, portrays the sculptor as he creates a series of famine sculptures from research, through to unveiling in Ireland Park, Toronto. Partly based on his reading of Joseph O'Connor's novel, Star of the Sea, Gillespie enters the world of its central character, the murderous Pius Mulvey as he haunts the decks of a coffin ship and becomes an emaciated ghost, living among the hundreds of Irish emigrants crammed into steerage. The documentary follows the sculptor as he brings the character to life in bronze.

Looking for Orion

More recently, an artistic biography Looking for Orion by Gillespie's lifelong friend, the artist and publisher Roger Kohn, provides an insider's view of Gillespie. The biography documents his contributions to his art over the last 36 years, and explores the influences of Edvard Munch and Henry Moore on the artist.
   
Gillespie is unique among the bronze casting fraternity in being able to claim that all moulding, casting and finishing is done entirely by himself in his Dublin studio/foundry. In addition, all installations are either carried out or supervised by him.

Themes
The Irish Famine and subsequent catastrophic migration has motivated two of Gillespie's works. In several of his site specific pieces, such as Famine (1997) on the Custom House Quay in Dublin, his life-sized human figures are emaciated and haunting. In June 2007, a series of statues by Gillespie was unveiled by President Mary McAleese on the quayside in Toronto's Ireland Park. The work commemorates the arrival of refugees from the Great Famine. The Hamilton Spectator described the work as follows:

"The early immigrants are now honoured at the Toronto waterfront park by five haunting bronze statues created by Irish sculptor Rowan Gillespie.
One figure depicts a man lying on the ground, emaciated; another shows a pregnant woman clutching her bulging stomach, while behind her a meek child stands wide-eyed. One frail figure is bent over with hands clasped in prayer, contrasted by a man whose arms are extended to the sky in salvation."

In lesser known, archived works such as Ambition and Aspiration, which climbs the wall of the Dublin Treasury Building, the artist reveals his sense of humour and somewhat different preoccupations. In his recent biography, an altogether different picture emerges. In his portrayals of James Joyce, William Butler Yeats, Samuel Beckett, Gerard Manley Hopkins, and Jesus Christ, Gillespie has undertaken his own spiritual and literary journey. His more conceptual and abstract pieces such as Looking at the Moon, The Kiss and the more recent, Proclamation, span the whole gamut of human emotions, from love and awe, to hate and self-destruction. As his biographer writes:

"Rowan's passionate and often draining encounters with his subjects, and his willingness to undergo personal transformation and rebirth in light of them, takes shape in the gnarled and volcanic textures of his later pieces. They stand before us as a mature, fully fledged portrait of an essentially rough-hewn and raw witness to the emotional turmoil of our time."

Proclamation
The original model for Proclamation was called Imagine and according to Gillespie's biographer:
 "it alluded not only to the John Lennon peace anthem, but also to the dreams for a utopian society in Ireland espoused by Rowan's grandfather, James Creed Meredith (1874-1942)".

Proclamation has, as its backdrop, the courthouse in which Meredith presided when he was a Circuit Court Judge. Fourteen figures stand in a megalithic circle, at the centre of which is a plaque containing a copy of the Proclamation of Independence, engraved in bronze. Each figure has at its base a small plaque, engraved with the name and the British military tribunal's verdict and sentence of death. The figures are perforated with bullet holes. Since the original commission was for the seven signatories of the Proclamation, Gillespie has donated the other seven martyrs to the site himself.

Solo exhibitions

 1974 Moss Kunst Foreningen, Norway
 1975 Galleri Cassandra, Norway
 1976 Galleri Cassandra, Norway
 Lad Lane Gallery, Dublin
 1977 Galleri 71 Tromso, Norway
 Bodo Kunst Foreningen, Norway
 Austin Hayes Gallery, York
 Lad Lane Gallery, Dublin
 1978 Galleri Cassandra, Norway
 1979 Alwin Gallery, London
 1980 Lad Lane Gallery, Dublin
 1981 Galerie Hüsstege, 's-Hertogenbosch
 1982 The Solomon Gallery, Dublin
 Galleri Cassandra, Norway
 1983 Puck Inaugural Exhibition, New York
 1983 Poole Wills Gallery, New York
 1984 The Solomon Gallery, Dublin
 1986-88 Solomon Gallery, Dublin
 Galerie Hüsstege, 's-Hertogenbosch
 Jonathan Poole Gallery, London
 1989 - 1994 Concentrated on site specific work
 1994 - 95 Solomon Gallery, Dublin
 Galerie Hüsstege, 's-Hertogenbosch
 1996 Decision to stop exhibition work in order to concentrate on site specific work.

References and sources
Notes

Sources

External links
 Artist's website
 Sculpting Life, Film/Biog
 The Migrants, Toronto
 The Migrants, Ireland Park
 Artistic Biography and Catalogue of Work, Looking for Orion

Gallery

Living people
Irish sculptors
People from Blackrock, Dublin
1953 births